Sudhakaran Ramanthali is a Malayalam language writer and translator from Kerala, India. He has translated 27 works from Kannada to Malayalam. He received many awards including Karnataka Sahitya Academy Award for Translation and Sahitya Akademi Translation Prize.

Biography 
Born in the village of Ramanthali near Payyanur in Kannur district, Sudhakaran completed his primary education in a government Malayalam medium school in his native place. After his higher education in Mysore, he joined Hindustan Aeronautics Limited (HAL) in Bangalore.

He was the main person behind the early Bangalore-based newspaper called Bangalore Nadam. A good speaker, and an organiser of many literary events in Bangalore, Sudhakaran is also a regular contributor to the socio-cultural societies of Bangalore and is a regular guest at important literary events in Kerala.

Personal life 
Sudhakaran and his wife Rugmini have three children. They currently lives in Bangalore, Karnataka.

Career 
Sudhakaran was not only a writer but also a social activist from a young age. At the age of 20, he joined Hindustan Aeronautics Limited as a technician and joined the Hindustan Aeronautics Employees Association. He later served as a leader of the association for many years. During his tenure at HAL, the company has a Workers' Education class. When the opportunity arose to study English or Kannada, Sudhakaran chose to study Kannada. He started learning Kannada after deciding for himself that Kannada, the state language, should be used to address the workers. His first teacher of Kannada was RN Chandrasekhar, a colleague at HAL, who later became a well-known writer and a prominent leader of the Kannada movement. After work, Chandrasekhar spent hours in the factory colony teaching him literature and discussing literature, sociology, and politics.

Sudhakaran has worked as the coordinator and editor at Kanaka Dasa Study research center at Bangalore and was member of several projects of the English Regional Institute. He also served as the President of the Bengaluru Kairali Arts Committee and Kairali Nilayam Schools.

Literary career 
Before starting translations, Sudhakaran Ramanthali has authored three novels, one screenplay and a collection of short stories. His first published work was Ramapurathinte Katha published in 1983.

At the end of an interview with Chandrasekhara Kampara, Sudhakaran was given five books by him and asked if he could translate them into Malayalam. Until then he had not translated any books into Malayalam and that is how he came to translate literature. He first translated Kambara's short novel called GK Mastarude Pranayakalam. But it was published later only. Jokumaraswamy, the first published work, was published in 2013. After that he has translated 27 works by eminent Kannada writers into Malayalam.

Selected works

Original works in Malayalam

Novel 
.
Arangozhiyunna Achuthan
Greeshmasandhyakal
Raghunathan Urangukayaanu

Screenplay 
Vazhithirivukal

Short story collection 
Pingami
Nam

Translations to Malayalam 
. Malayalam translation of Shikhara Surya by Chandrashekhara Kambar
. Malayalam translation of Karimayi by Chandrashekhara Kambar
. Malayalam translation of Shivana Damgura by Chandrashekhara Kambar
. Malayalam translation of ‘’Parvam’’ by S. L. Bhyrappa
. Malayalam translation of Athikramanam by S. L. Bhyrappa
 translation of novel Divya by U. R. Ananthamurthy
  Malayalam translation of article collection Iruvudellava bittu by Prakash Raj.
  Malayalam translation of article collection by Prakash Raj.
. Malayalam translation of Jokumaraswami by Chandrashekhara Kambar
 Malayalam translation of novel by Chandrashekhara Kambar
 Ghachar Ghochar, Malayalam translation of Kannada work Ghachar Ghochar by Vivek Shanbhag.
He also translated the hymns of the 17th century poet Kanaka Dasa into Malayalam, in three volumes, for the Department of Kannada Culture, Government of Karnataka.
He is currently translating Mahabharata by Kumara Vyasa (Narayanappa) into Malayalam. It is a poem of 48,000 lines.
He also translated the Kannada novel Su by Prasanna Santhekadur into Malayalam.

Awards 
 Sahitya Akademi Translation Prize 2020 for Malayalam translation of ‘’Shikhara Surya’’ by Chandrashekhara Kambar.
 Karnataka Sahitya Academy Award for Translation Literature 2022, for Shivante Kadumthudi, the Malayalam translation of ‘’Shivana Damgura’’ by Chandrashekhara Kambar.
 CV Chathunni Nair Memorial Award for his contribution to Malayalam translation
 Poorna Uroob Award
 The first Mangalam Novel Award for "Ramapurathinte Katha"
Tejaswini Award of the Mahakavi P Kunhiraman Nair Foundationfor Shivante Kadumthudi, the Malayalam translation of Shivana Damgura by Chandrashekhara Kambar.

References 

Malayalam-language writers
People from Kannur district
Translators to Malayalam
Year of birth missing (living people)
Living people
Recipients of the Sahitya Akademi Prize for Translation
Writers from Kannur
Malayalam novelists